The 2015 Atlantic Sun men's basketball tournament was the 37th edition of the Atlantic Sun Conference Championship. It took place from March 3 through March 8, 2015 on campus sites with the higher-seeded school hosting each game throughout the championship. The North Florida Ospreys won their first Atlantic Sun Tournament championship, earning an automatic bid to the 2015 NCAA tournament.

Format
The A-Sun Championship was a six-day single-elimination tournament. Eight teams competed in the championship. On July 22, 2014, the A-Sun announced Northern Kentucky will be eligible for all conference postseason championships for which their teams qualify starting with the upcoming 2014-15 academic year, as part of their transition to Division I from Division II. The Norse must still complete the four-year reclassification period before becoming eligible for NCAA Championships. The change in A-Sun policy arose after NCAA clarification that a conference may set specific criteria allowing its highest ranked finisher to be the AQ recipient if a non-eligible team were to participate and win the conference postseason tournament. Prior policy had determined that the conference would lose its AQ if an ineligible team won the tournament.  However, that potential scenario did not happen, as the Norse lost their first-round game to Lipscomb by a score of 76-73. This proved to be Northern Kentucky's only A-Sun tournament game ever, as the school would move to the Horizon League effective with the 2015–16 school year.

East Tennessee State, along with defending champion Mercer, did not participate in the tournament after moving to the Southern Conference.

With ETSU and Mercer no longer in the A-Sun and FGCU eliminated in the semifinals, the tournament winner of the championship game between USC Upstate and North Florida was assured of making their first appearance in the NCAA Tournament. North Florida would represent the A-Sun with a 63–57 win.

Seeds

Schedule

Bracket

See also
2014–15 NCAA Division I men's basketball season
Atlantic Sun men's basketball tournament

References

External links 
Atlantic Sun Men's Basketball Championship Details

ASUN men's basketball tournament
Tournament
Atlantic Sun men's basketball tournament
Atlantic Sun men's basketball tournament